Aurian is a book in The Artefacts of Power Series.

To the city of Nexis, where Magefolk in their white walled towers rule uneasily over a restive race of Mortals, a young girl come to learn the magic arts. Aurian, a quicksilver swordswoman, has inherited Earth-magic from her mother and Fire-magic from her father. Unawakened within her lie far greater powers, coveted by the Archmage Miathan, who intends to possess her. But Aurian bravely flouts the Mages' Code and takes a mortal lover. Maddened by rage and jealousy, the corrupt Arachmage schemes to destroy her, unleashing cataclysmic forces from a lost age. Aurian is the only Mage strong enough to oppose Miathan, but to do so she must take up forbidden weapons of long-lost magic, at grave peril of her own destruction...or the annihilation of her very world.

References

External links

Prénom Aurian 

Il semblerais que les humains portant le prénom "Aurian" ont la même coupe que Jul et sont carolos. En d'autres termes, ils iront en enfer

British fantasy novels
1994 novels